The Compleat Beatles, released in 1982, is a two-hour documentary chronicling the career of the Beatles. Although it has since been supplanted by the longer and more in-depth documentary Beatles Anthology, The Compleat Beatles was for many years largely regarded as the definitive film about the Beatles.

Narrated by actor Malcolm McDowell, it includes extensive interviews with a number of sources close to the Beatles. Some of the people interviewed are producer George Martin, their first manager Allan Williams, Cavern Club DJ Bob Wooler, music writer Bill Harry, and musicians Gerry Marsden, Billy J. Kramer, Marianne Faithfull, Billy Preston, Lenny Kaye, and Tony Sheridan. The film also includes archival footage of interviews with members of the Beatles and their manager Brian Epstein. Authors Nicholas Schaffner and Wilfrid Mellers are among the commentators who offer their views on the band's career. The Compleat Beatles also features early concert footage, behind-the-scenes background on the making of their albums, and candid footage of their often obsessed, hysterical fans.

Directed by Patrick Montgomery, the film was produced by Delilah Films/Electronic Arts Pictures and released theatrically by Metro-Goldwyn-Mayer and United Artists in 1984.

Video releases

The Compleat Beatles was initially released as a PBS documentary in the United States, and then on VHS, Betamax, CED and Laserdisc that same year on the MGM/UA Home Video label.  The 1982 Laserdisc was released in both Analogue and Stereo versions, as well as being released in Japan and England (in PAL format) in 1983.

The film did very well, and in 1984 Delilah Films and Metro-Goldwyn-Mayer arranged for it to be released theatrically in the U.S. by a small distributor named Teleculture. This contributed to its continuing to be a best seller on VHS. Some years later, when Paul McCartney was preparing The Beatles Anthology, he bought the negative and all the rights to the film from Delilah to get it off of the market and clear the way for his production. That, according to the film's director Patrick Montgomery, is why it is not available on DVD or any newer formats and "probably never will be."

References

External links
 

1982 films
Rockumentaries
American documentary films
1982 documentary films
Documentary films about the Beatles
Television programmes about the Beatles
1980s English-language films
1980s American films